Tara Brabazon (born 3 January 1969) is the Australian Dean of Graduate Research and the Professor of Cultural Studies at Flinders University in Adelaide, Australia, a fellow of the Royal Society for the Encouragement of Arts, Manufactures & Commerce and director of the Popular Culture Collective. She has previously held academic positions in the UK, New Zealand and Canada, won six teaching awards, published 20 books, written 250 refereed articles and contributed essays and opinion pieces on higher education and the arts.  She was made a Member of the Order of Australia in 2019.

Scholarship 
Brabazon's key areas of research include media literacies, popular cultural studies, creative industries, city imaging, regional development, the knowledge economy, information management, information literacy, cultural studies and the negotiation of cultural difference.  She has developed a series of concepts through her career including "the Google Effect," "Digital Dieting", and the 3Ds (digitization, disintermedation and deterritorialization). Brabazon is also continuing the work of the late Professor Steve Redhead by developing the "claustropolitanism" theory, as a revision of cosmopolitan sociology.

While a Professor of Media in the United Kingdom, Brabazon delivered her Inaugural Address titled "Google is White Bread of the Mind." This research was presented in her book The University of Google. She explored the development of information literacy in the first year of university degrees.

Her professional roles have led to specialisations in aspects of cultural difference, social inclusion, doctoral education, contemporary higher education and leadership.  As Dean of Graduate Research, Brabazon developed a weekly vlog series for higher degree students. They currently number 300 videos, most created from requests by students.

Qualifications 
 Bachelor of Arts, First Class Honours in History. University of Western Australia. 1991.
 Bachelor of Literature and Communication. Murdoch University. 1993.
 Bachelor of Professional Education, Passed with Distinction. Central Queensland University. 1999.
 Graduate Diploma in Internet Studies, with Distinction. Curtin University. 2002.
 Le Cordon Bleu Graduate Diploma of Gastronomic Tourism. Southern Cross University. 2016.
 Master of Letters in Cultural Studies. Central Queensland University. 1995.
 Master of Leadership. Deakin University. 2021.
 Master of Education with Honours Class 1. University of New England. 2007.
 Master of Arts, Passed with Distinction. University of Western Australia. 1994.
 Doctor of Philosophy. Murdoch University. 1995.

Personal life 
Tara Brabazon was born in Perth, Western Australia, going on to write a book about its music in Liverpool of the South Seas.  She married Professor Steve Redhead in 2002.  Their relationship was featured in the Times Higher Education under the title Marital Bliss.  After Redhead's death from pancreatic cancer in 2018, Brabazon wrote about their relationship in the second edition of The End of the Century Party.

Brabazon is currently married to Professor Jamie Quinton, Professor of Physics and Nanotechnology at Flinders University.

Major publications
Tara Brabazon. 2022. Twelve rules for (academic) life:  A stroppy feminist's guide through teaching, learning, politics, and Jordan Peterson. Singapore: Springer.
Tara Brabazon, Tiffany Lyndall Knight, and Natalie Hills. 2020.  The Creative PhD: Challenges, Opportunities and Reflexive Practice. Bingley:  Emerald.
Tara Brabazon, Steve Redhead and Sunny Rue Chivaura. 2018. Trump Studies: An intellectual guide to why citizens do not act in their best interests. Bingley: Emerald.
Tara Brabazon (eds.). 2015. Play: A theory of learning and change. Berlin: Springer.
Tara Brabazon. 2015. Enabling University: Impairment, (dis)ability and social justice in higher education. Berlin: Springer.
Tara Brabazon. 2014. Unique Urbanity? Rethinking third tier cities, degeneration, regeneration and mobility. Berlin: Springer.
Tara Brabazon, Mick Winter and Bryn Gandy. 2014. Digital Wine: How QR codes facilitate new markets for small wine industries. Berlin: Springer.
Tara Brabazon. 2013. Digital Dieting: From information obesity to intellectual fitness. Aldershot: Ashgate.
Tara Brabazon (ed.). 2013. City Imaging: Regeneration, renewal and decay. Berlin: Springer.
Tara Brabazon (ed.). 2012. Digital Dialogues and Community 2.0: After avatars, trolls and puppets. Oxford: Chandos.
Tara Brabazon. 2010.Popular Music: Topics, trends, trajectories. London: Sage. 
Tara Brabazon (ed.). 2008. The Revolution Will Not Be Downloaded: Dissent in the digital age. Oxford: Chandos.
Tara Brabazon (ed.). 2008. Thinking Popular Culture: War, terrorism and writing. Aldershot: Ashgate.
Tara Brabazon. 2007. The University of Google: Education in the (post) information age. Aldershot: Ashgate.
Tara Brabazon. 2006. Playing on the Periphery: Sport, memory, identity. London: Routledge.
Tara Brabazon. 2005. From Revolution to Revelation: Generation X, popular culture, popular memory. Aldershot: Ashgate.
Tara Brabazon (eds.). 2005. Liverpool of the South Seas: Perth and its popular music. Perth: UWA Press.
Tara Brabazion. 2002. Digital Hemlock: Internet education and the poisoning of teaching. Sydney: UNSW Press.
Tara Brabazon. 2002. Ladies who Lunge: Celebrating difficult women. Sydney: UNSW Press.
Tara Brabazon. 2000. Tracking the Jack: A retracing of the Antipodes. Sydney: UNSW Press.

Audiobooks 
Brabazon has developed new strategies for research dissemination through the audiobook, producing three titles between 2018 and 2022.

 Trump Studies (2018)
 Memories of the Future (2019)
 Comma (2022)

This project is developing through the 'auditory academic' initiative, offering sonic activism and interventions through diverse sonic platforms.

Journalism
Brabazon is a columnist for a range of education and cultural publications.  She has produced over 150 articles for the Times Higher Education, and has written for the Times Literary Supplement, Times Education Supplement, The Guardian, Arts Hub Australia, Arts Hub UK, and Campus Review, also featuring on the cover of a 2019 edition. She has been profiled in a range of publications, including The Guardian.

References

External links 
 Bio at archived Australian of the Year site
 Bio at Teaching Excellence Award
 Digital Hemlock at the Western Australian Premier's Book Award
 Popular Culture Collective homepage
 Arts Hub UK
 Arts Hub Australia
 University of Brighton Master of Arts Creative Media
 Tara Brabazon on Google Scholar

1969 births
People from Perth, Western Australia
Academics of the University of Brighton
Australian non-fiction writers
Cultural academics
Cultural historians
Living people
Academic staff of Charles Sturt University
Academic staff of Central Queensland University
Academic staff of Flinders University